Sandra Le Dréan (born 13 May 1977) is a French former basketball player who competed in the 2000 Summer Olympics. She was born in Rennes.

References

1977 births
Living people
Sportspeople from Rennes
French women's basketball players
Olympic basketball players of France
Basketball players at the 2000 Summer Olympics